The Grudge 2 is a 2006 supernatural horror film and a sequel to the 2004 film The Grudge. Produced by Sam Raimi, the film was directed by Takashi Shimizu, written by Stephen Susco and stars an ensemble cast that includes Amber Tamblyn,  Arielle Kebbel, Jennifer Beals, Edison Chen, Sarah Roemer and Sarah Michelle Gellar. As stated by Shimizu, the film is not a remake of any Japanese film and follows a different storyline. Like its predecessor, the film features a plot that is told through a non-linear sequence of events and includes several intersecting subplots. The three main subplots include: Karen's younger sister Aubrey coming to Japan after finding out about Doug's death, a schoolgirl named Allison being haunted by the ghosts after entering the house with two of her classmates and a young boy named Jake whose apartment building is haunted by the ghosts of the Saeki family.

The film was announced after the release of the previous film in October 2004, due to its financial success. Shimizu was announced to return as director in January 2005 and casting begun on December, with the announcement of Gellar returning. The film was shot entirely in Japan, with Tamblyn performing re-shoots in Chicago, Illinois.

The Grudge 2 was theatrically released in the United States on October 13, 2006, by Columbia Pictures. The film received negative reviews, and made over $70 million worldwide against a $20 million budget. A sequel, The Grudge 3, was released direct-to-video on May 12, 2009, while a sidequel, The Grudge, was theatrically released on January 3, 2020.

Plot
The Grudge is described as a curse that is born when someone dies in the grip of extreme rage or sorrow. The curse is an entity created where the person died. Those who encounter this supernatural force die and the curse is reborn repeatedly, passing from victim to victim in an endless, growing chain of horror. The following events are explained in their actual order, however, the film is presented in a nonlinear narrative.

In 2004, American social worker Karen Davis tried to burn down the Saeki house to stop the curse, but failed, finding herself hospitalised and haunted by Kayako. Karen's younger sister, Aubrey, goes to Tokyo to retrieve her. In Japan, Aubrey struggles to communicate with the hospital staff but a journalist named Eason aids her. Aubrey briefly speaks with Karen, who panics and has to be restrained. Karen is later killed by Kayako in front of Aubrey and Eason. Eason explains the curse to Aubrey, revealing he rescued Karen from the house fire and has been investigating the Saeki murders and surrounding events.

The two go to the house to retrieve Kayako's diary, but Toshio drags Aubrey inside to curse her. Eason takes the diary to an associate, who explains Kayako's mother, Nakagawa Kawamata, was an itako who exorcised evil spirits from visitors and fed them to her daughter. Eason and Aubrey make plans to visit Kawamata. As Eason develops photographs he took of the Saeki house, Kayako emerges from a photo and murders him. After discovering his body, Aubrey travels alone to Kawamata's remote rural home. Kawamata skeptically warns her the curse is irreversible before being killed by her daughter. Aubrey ventures to the house, following an image of Karen inside. She encounters Takeo's ghost, who reenacts the night he discovered his wife's disloyalty and snaps Aubrey's neck.

In 2006, school girls Allison Fleming, Vanessa Cassidy and Miyuki Nazawa break into the house on a dare, but Allison is locked in the closet and encounters a ghost resembling Kayako (revealed to be Aubrey at the end of the film) but the girls escape. After Miyuki and Vanessa are consumed by the curse, Allison speaks with school counsellor Ms. Dale about the curse, but Dale denies its existence, revealing she went to the house and is actually a ghost herself. Allison is haunted by the ghosts of her friends and she eventually flees back to Chicago, where she stays with her parents.

The Kimbles move into an apartment block in Chicago. A young boy named Jake is disturbed by a strange presence in the building brought about by a hooded stranger who covers windows with newspaper. Jake's father Bill and stepmother Trish are influenced by the curse, Bill accusing his wife of having an affair and she bludgeons him with a frying pan. Jake and his sister, Lacey, return from school, but Jake finds his family are all dead. He runs into the hooded person, revealed to be Allison, who explains the curse followed her. Kayako appears in Allison's hood, finally taking her and then emerges to assault Jake.

Cast

 Amber Tamblyn as Aubrey Davis, Karen's younger sister
 Arielle Kebbel as Allison Fleming, a shy and emotional exchange student from Chicago, Illinois USA who attended Tokyo International School in Tokyo, Japan.
 Sarah Michelle Gellar as Karen Davis, the sole, traumatized survivor of The Grudge
 Takako Fuji as Kayako Saeki, wife of Takeo Saeki, mother of Toshio Saeki, daughter of Nakagawa Kawamata and the titular role of the movie.
 Kyoka Takizawa as Young Kayako
 Edison Chen as Eason, a journalist who is investigating the Saeki murders
 Teresa Palmer as Vanessa Cassidy, the popular schoolgirl bully of Tokyo International High School
 Misako Uno as Miyuki Nazawa, Vanessa's best friend
 Matthew Knight as Jake Kimble, a young boy who suspects something happening in their apartment
 Sarah Roemer as Lacey Kimble, a cheerleader and Jake's kind and supporting older sister
 Jennifer Beals as Trish Kimble, Bill's new wife
 Christopher Cousins as Bill Kimble, Jake and Lacey's father
 Jenna Dewan as Sally, Lacey's neighbor and best friend
 Eve Gordon as Principal Dale, Tokyo International High School's counselor
 Ohga Tanaka and Yuya Ozeki (archive footage) as Toshio Saeki, Kayako and Takeo's 7-year-old son
 Takashi Matsuyama as Takeo Saeki, Kayako's husband who becomes angry after seeing that she has feelings for another man
 Joanna Cassidy as Mrs. Davis, Karen and Aubrey's sick mother who lives in Pasadena, California, USA.
 Shaun Sipos as Michael, Miyuki's boyfriend
 Jason Behr as Doug, Karen's boyfriend (in photographs)
 Kim Miyori as Nakagawa Kawamata, Kayako's mother and a Japanese itako
 Ryo Ishibashi as Detective Nakagawa (in interview video)
 Paul Jarrett as John Fleming, Allison's father
 Gwenda Lorenzetti as Annie Fleming, Allison's mother

Production
The Grudge 2 was announced three days after the release of The Grudge in 2004 and was officially fasttracked after a positive box office response with the film grossing $110,175,871. In early January 2005, Shimizu suggested ideas regarding the film's plot. Ideas included the origin of the curse and new character subplots. The film was later placed into development hell for almost a year until December 2005, when the first few cast members were announced (Sarah Michelle Gellar and Teresa Palmer) . Other production details were also revealed, including the original scheduled date for principal photography, which was due to begin January 30, 2006, but was postponed until February.

Principal photography for The Grudge 2 was held at Toho Studios in Tokyo, Japan and production wrapped up on April 25, 2006. During an interview on Dread Central with Amber Tamblyn, it was reported that sets were created in Chicago for Tamblyn to re-shoot several scenes.

Shimizu said in an interview with Sci Fi Wire, "For The Grudge 2, I was going for this mystery that was never there in The Grudge and I think that's going to fulfill the audience. ... There's a secret about Kayako's childhood life, so that's part of the big mystery. And the other mystery is this grudge will never stop and it's going to ... spread. And how is it going to get spread? That's another mystery." He also clarified that "The Grudge was a complete remake of Ju-on, meaning the storyline was very similar. Basically, it's the same. But Grudge 2 is actually different from Ju-on: The Grudge 2 and I don't think I would have accepted this job if it was going to be the same storyline. And because it was a different story, you know, my motivation was a bit higher and I actually enjoy doing this."

Release

The Grudge 2 premiered at Knott's Berry Farm in Buena Park, California on October 8, 2006. During the premiere, the theme park was open to the public and featured a Grudge 2 maze as part of its 2006 Halloween Haunt.

Marketing
Sony employed various methods to promote The Grudge 2. On April 1, 2006, a teaser site was launched with details revealing the October 13 release date. Many forum sites such as IMDb were swamped with claims that Sony was playing an April Fool's joke. A few days later, the site's authenticity was proven and claims that it was a hoax were dismissed. On September 10, 2006, Sony released a missing persons file on its official blog stating a student filmmaker known as "Jason C" (Jason Cutler) disappeared a few weeks after visiting the set of the film. The blog originally broadcast interviews with the film's stars including Tamblyn, Gellar and Jenna Dewan but had been taken over by his roommate who filed the report. On September 19, 2006, Yahoo! Movies was the first site to release three short films titled Tales from the Grudge with an introduction from one of the producers of The Grudge, Sam Raimi. The series of shorts expands on the story of the Saeki curse. The shorts also appear on the film's official site Sony Pictures Entertainment; fans who volunteered their mobile phone number received surprise calls from Kayako or Toshio. The films also became available on other film and horror-related websites as part of a wide-reaching and unique digital marketing strategy. The shorts were directed by Toby Wilkins (director of The Grudge 3) and written by Ben Ketai.
 Part 1, "Hotel": The first in the series of shorts. It introduces Ross (played by Daniel Sykes) as he wakes up in a Tokyo hotel room and coughs up quantities of Kayako's black hair. He wakes from this nightmare to the sound of the mobile phone and answers it. The caller is his girlfriend Abby (played by Stefanie Butler), who is safe at home. Ross explains that his attempts to investigate the house and the woman with long black hair have led to a dead end. When the phone call ends, we stay with Ross as he takes a photo of himself with his mobile phone. He does not notice as Kayako passes by behind him at the precise moment he takes the shot. He then sends the picture to Abby. Ross then goes to brush his teeth and finds black hair in his toothbrush before being grabbed through the mirror by Kayako.
 Part 2, "School": The second short film in which we follow the story of Abby as she ends the phone call from the first short. Abby then proceeds to call her friend Brooke (played by Ginny Weirick) to ask about plans that evening. When the call ends, Abby receives a photo message from her boyfriend Ross (from the first short). When Abby looks closer at the image, she sees that Kayako is in the hotel room with Ross. Abby attempts to call her boyfriend and warn him, but she only hears Kayako and then it hangs up. Abby looks over at the girl that was sitting beside her to see Kayako.
 Part 3, "House": The third short film that overlaps during the events in "School." The film opens with Brooke (as introduced in the second short) receiving a phone call from Abby. As the call ends, Brooke agrees to play hide and seek with the child, Josh, whom she is babysitting and chooses a walk-in closet as her hiding place. Brooke soon finds herself trapped and is dragged violently into the underworld by Kayako. Josh then gets up and says "Come out, come out, wherever you are," before Brooke's cell phone begins ringing.

Home media
The Grudge 2 was released on DVD and UMD video for the PlayStation Portable on February 6, 2007. Both are available in a rated and unrated director's cut format. The unrated format is 6 minutes longer than the rated version, clocking in at 108 minutes as opposed to the theatrical cut which is 102 minutes. Both DVD formats include the following extras:
Tales from the Grudge webisodes (Region 1 only)
Cast and crew reel change montage
Four featurettes:
Holding a Grudge: Kayako & Toshio
East Meets West
Grudge 2 Storyline Development
Ready When You Are Mr Shimizu
Deleted scenes
The movie was also made available on iTunes in October 2008. A Blu-ray Disc version of the film has yet to be released in the United States, having only received a Blu-ray in France on March 2, 2010, in a disc which is Region Locked, and a Blu-ray in the Netherlands on March 14, 2013, that is Region Free but missing the extras. Both contain the Unrated Cut.

The film debuted on Blu-ray in the United Kingdom on November 2, 2020.

Sales
The DVD sold $5,233,327 in its first week, much lower than the previous film's $9 million. In its second week of retail availability it sold a further $3,060,351 for a total of $8,293,678 within two weeks. It is estimated to have earned at least $15 million from home media sales since, bringing the film's total gross to $85 million.

Reception

Box office
The film opened in 3,211 theaters and was expected to generate $27 million across the October 13–15 weekend but generated $10,018,039 on its opening day and $20.8 million on its opening weekend. It placed number one at the box office, beating out The Departed. The film showed poor staying power and earned $39.1 million in North America, making it the first ever film to open over $20 million yet gross less than 50% of its earnings after opening weekend. It also easily set the record for lowest gross of a $20 million opener. It earned an additional $30 million internationally. The movie made $70 million worldwide.

Critical response
The film was one of three films not shown to critics on the release date (the other two being The Marine and One Night with the King). It received notably worse reviews from critics than its predecessor, with an approval rating of 12% on Rotten Tomatoes (76 reviews) compared to The Grudges 40%. The site's consensus simply labels the film as "A diminished sequel that makes even less sense than The Grudge 1". Metacritic gave the film a score of 33/100 based on reviews from 16 critics, indicating "generally unfavorable reviews". The film was criticized by several critics for its confusing plot. Keith Phipps from The A.V. Club wrote, "While The Grudge 2 deserves some credit for creating and sustaining a creepy atmosphere, it doesn't matter much when the plot doesn't go anywhere." Pete Vonder Haar from Film Threat found "[t]he same problems that plagued the original are on display here. Most notably, the lack of any coherent plot." Paul Debrudge from Variety stated, "The story is incidental, as auds merely anticipate the scares." Tim Goernert from Joblo "found it really hard to follow the story as well, as there were three of them happening at the same time." The film has also been criticized as being eye candy. Terry Lawson from the Detroit Free Press judged, "The Grudge 2 is just a mélange of images, some mildly disturbing, but mostly just variations on a theme."

References

External links

 
  (archive) 
 Production notes  at Sci-Fi Japan
 
 
 The Grudge 2 Reviews at Metacritic.com
 
Review at Dread Central

2006 films
2000s psychological horror films
American supernatural horror films
Films directed by Takashi Shimizu
Columbia Pictures films
Ghost House Pictures films
American haunted house films
2000s Japanese-language films
American sequel films
Japan in fiction
American nonlinear narrative films
Films about curses
Films produced by Sam Raimi
Films scored by Christopher Young
Films set in 2004
Films set in 2006
Films set in Chicago
Films set in California
Films set in Tokyo
Films shot in Tokyo
American ghost films
2000s supernatural horror films
American psychological horror films
Films with screenplays by Stephen Susco
Asian-American horror films
The Grudge (film series)
Japan in non-Japanese culture
2000s English-language films
2000s American films